Homeland (translit. Ieji) is a 2014 Japanese drama film directed by Nao Kubota. The film had its premiere in the Panorama section of the 64th Berlin International Film Festival.

Cast
 Ken'ichi Matsuyama
 Yûko Tanaka
 Masaaki Uchino
 Ken Mitsuishi
 Yoji Tanaka
 Renji Ishibashi
 Sakura Ando
 Takashi Yamanaka

References

External links
 

2014 films
2014 drama films
2014 directorial debut films
Japanese drama films
2010s Japanese-language films
Films about the 2011 Tōhoku earthquake and tsunami
2010s Japanese films